This is a list of 282 species in Tomosvaryella, a genus of big-headed flies in the family Pipunculidae.

Tomosvaryella species

Tomosvaryella aegyptia Kuznetzov, 1994
Tomosvaryella aeneiventris (Kertész, 1903)
Tomosvaryella africana Hardy, 1949
Tomosvaryella agnesea Hardy, 1940
Tomosvaryella albiseta Cresson, 1911
Tomosvaryella aliena Hardy, 1947
Tomosvaryella amazonensis De Meyer & Skevington, 2000
Tomosvaryella ancylostyla Hardy, 1961
Tomosvaryella angolensis De Meyer, 1993
Tomosvaryella angulata Kehlmaier & Majnon-Jahromi, 2017
Tomosvaryella anomala Hardy, 1949
Tomosvaryella apicalis Hardy, 1949
Tomosvaryella appendipes (Cresson, 1911)
Tomosvaryella argentea (Sack, 1935)
Tomosvaryella argenteiventris Kuznetzov, 1994
Tomosvaryella argentifrons Kuznetzov, 1994
Tomosvaryella argentosa Kuznetzov, 1994
Tomosvaryella arguta Kuznetzov, 1994
Tomosvaryella argyrata De Meyer, 1995
Tomosvaryella argyratoides De Meyer, 1995
Tomosvaryella armata Hardy, 1940
Tomosvaryella aurata Ale-Rocha, 1996
Tomosvaryella baderiensis Kapoor, Grewal & Sharma, 1987
Tomosvaryella basalis Hardy, 1950
Tomosvaryella beameri Hardy, 1940
Tomosvaryella bidens (Cresson, 1911)
Tomosvaryella bissulca Ale-Rocha, 1996
Tomosvaryella botswanae De Meyer, 1993
Tomosvaryella brachybasis De Meyer, 1993
Tomosvaryella brachyscolops Hardy, 1961
Tomosvaryella brevidens Kuznetzov, 1994
Tomosvaryella brevijuncta Hardy, 1943
Tomosvaryella bugalensis Kuznetzov, 1994
Tomosvaryella bulganensis Kuznetzov, 1994
Tomosvaryella caerulescens De Meyer, 1993
Tomosvaryella cagiae Skevington & Foldvari, 2007
Tomosvaryella calcarata Hardy, 1968
Tomosvaryella caligata Hardy, 1968
Tomosvaryella chilensis Ale-Rocha, 1996
Tomosvaryella cilifemorata (Becker, 1907)
Tomosvaryella cilifera Kuznetzov, 1994
Tomosvaryella cilitarsis (Strobl, 1910)
Tomosvaryella claripennis (Loew, 1858)
Tomosvaryella columbiana (Kertész, 1915)
Tomosvaryella comaousa De Meyer, 1990
Tomosvaryella concavifronta Yang & Xu, 1998
Tomosvaryella congoana Hardy, 1950
Tomosvaryella contorta (Hardy, 1939)
Tomosvaryella coquilletti (Kertész, 1907)
Tomosvaryella coquilletticoquilletti (Kertész, 1907)
Tomosvaryella cornuta Kuznetzov, 1994
Tomosvaryella corusca Skevington & Foldvari, 2007
Tomosvaryella crassa Ale-Rocha, 2004
Tomosvaryella crassifemorata De Meyer, 1993
Tomosvaryella crinita Ale-Rocha, 1996
Tomosvaryella curta Ale-Rocha, 1996
Tomosvaryella curtissima Kuznetzov, 1993
Tomosvaryella curvipatis Kapoor, Grewal & Sharma, 1987
Tomosvaryella debruyni De Meyer, 1995
Tomosvaryella deformis Hardy, 1947
Tomosvaryella dehraduniensis Kapoor, Grewal & Sharma, 1987
Tomosvaryella denticulatus Kapoor, Grewal & Sharma, 1987
Tomosvaryella dentiterebra Collin, 1949
Tomosvaryella deserticola Kuznetzov, 1993
Tomosvaryella diffusa Ale-Rocha, 1996
Tomosvaryella disjuncta (Becker, 1900)
Tomosvaryella dissimilis Hardy, 1943
Tomosvaryella dividua Kuznetzov, 1994
Tomosvaryella docta De Meyer, 1995
Tomosvaryella dongyue Yang & Xu, 1998
Tomosvaryella ekyphysis Ale-Rocha, 1996
Tomosvaryella epichalca (Perkins, 1905)
Tomosvaryella equistylis Kapoor, Grewal & Sharma, 1987
Tomosvaryella eusylvatica Kapoor, Grewal & Sharma, 1987
Tomosvaryella exilidens Hardy, 1943
Tomosvaryella falkovitshi Kuznetzov, 1993
Tomosvaryella femella Kuznetzov, 1993
Tomosvaryella flaviantenna (Hardy and Knowlton, 1939)
Tomosvaryella flavicrus Hardy, 1968
Tomosvaryella flavipes De Meyer, 1993
Tomosvaryella flexa Kuznetzov, 1994
Tomosvaryella floridensis Hardy, 1940
Tomosvaryella forchhammeri De Meyer, 1993
Tomosvaryella forter Yang & Xu, 1998
Tomosvaryella freidbergi De Meyer, 1995
Tomosvaryella frontata (Becker, 1898)
Tomosvaryella galapagensis (Curran, 1934)
Tomosvaryella gazliensis Kuznetzov, 1994
Tomosvaryella geniculata (Meigen, 1824)
Tomosvaryella genitalis Kapoor, Grewal & Sharma, 1987
Tomosvaryella gibbosa Hardy, 1949
Tomosvaryella gobiensis De Meyer & Skevington, 2000
Tomosvaryella gussakovskyi Kuznetzov, 1994
Tomosvaryella guwahatiensis Kapoor, Grewal & Sharma, 1987
Tomosvaryella hactena Hardy, 1972
Tomosvaryella helwanensis Collin, 1949
Tomosvaryella hildeae De Meyer, 1997
Tomosvaryella hirticollis (Becker, 1910)
Tomosvaryella hispanica De Meyer, 1997
Tomosvaryella hissarica Kuznetzov, 1993
Tomosvaryella hongorica Kuznetzov, 1994
Tomosvaryella hortobagyiensis Foldvari & De Meyer, 2000
Tomosvaryella hozretishiensis Kuznetzov, 1994
Tomosvaryella immutata (Becker, 1913)
Tomosvaryella inazumae (Koizumi, 1960)
Tomosvaryella incompta Ale-Rocha, 1996
Tomosvaryella incondita Hardy, 1961
Tomosvaryella inconspicus (Malloch, 1912)
Tomosvaryella indica Kapoor, Grewal & Sharma, 1987
Tomosvaryella inermis De Meyer, 1995
Tomosvaryella inopinata De Meyer, 1995
Tomosvaryella insulicola De Meyer, 1993
Tomosvaryella israelensis De Meyer, 1995
Tomosvaryella itoi (Koizumi, 1960)
Tomosvaryella jubata De Meyer, 1995
Tomosvaryella kalevala Kehlmaier, 2008
Tomosvaryella karakalaensis Kuznetzov, 1994
Tomosvaryella kashipurensis Kapoor, Grewal & Sharma, 1987
Tomosvaryella kirghizorum Kuznetzov, 1993
Tomosvaryella kondarensis Kuznetzov, 1993
Tomosvaryella kuthyi Aczél, 1944
Tomosvaryella lata Kuznetzov, 1994
Tomosvaryella laticlavia Kuznetzov, 1994
Tomosvaryella latitarsis Hardy, 1950
Tomosvaryella leimonias (Perkins, 1905)
Tomosvaryella lepidipes Hardy, 1943
Tomosvaryella leri Kuznetzov, 1994
Tomosvaryella limpidipennis (Brunetti, 1912)
Tomosvaryella littoralis (Becker, 1898)
Tomosvaryella longipygianus Kapoor, Grewal & Sharma, 1987
Tomosvaryella longiseta Ale-Rocha, 1996
Tomosvaryella longistylus Kapoor, Grewal & Sharma, 1987
Tomosvaryella longula Kuznetzov, 1994
Tomosvaryella luppovae Kuznetzov, 1994
Tomosvaryella lynchi (Shannon, 1927)
Tomosvaryella lyneborgi (Coe, 1969)
Tomosvaryella manauensis Ale-Rocha, 1996
Tomosvaryella mbuyensis Hardy, 1952
Tomosvaryella mediocris (Collin, 1931)
Tomosvaryella membranacea Ale-Rocha & Rafael, 1995
Tomosvaryella membranosa Kuznetzov, 1994
Tomosvaryella mesasiatica Kuznetzov, 1994
Tomosvaryella mesostena Hardy, 1961
Tomosvaryella mexicanensis Ale-Rocha & Rafael, 1995
Tomosvaryella micronesiae Hardy, 1956
Tomosvaryella mimica Kuznetzov, 1994
Tomosvaryella minacis Hardy, 1940
Tomosvaryella minima (Becker, 1898)
Tomosvaryella minuscula (Collin, 1956)
Tomosvaryella minutus Kapoor, Grewal & Sharma, 1987
Tomosvaryella moala Skevington & Foldvari, 2007
Tomosvaryella mongolica Kozanek, 1992
Tomosvaryella montana De Meyer, 1993
Tomosvaryella montina Kuznetzov, 1994
Tomosvaryella multisetae Kapoor, Grewal & Sharma, 1987
Tomosvaryella mutata (Becker, 1898)
Tomosvaryella nalaihiana Kuznetzov, 1994
Tomosvaryella nartshukae Kuznetzov, 1994
Tomosvaryella nigra Kuznetzov, 1994
Tomosvaryella nigritula Zetterstedt, 1844
Tomosvaryella nigronitida (Collin, 1958)
Tomosvaryella nitens Brunetti, 1912
Tomosvaryella nodosa De Meyer, 1995
Tomosvaryella novaezealandiae Tonnoir, 1925
Tomosvaryella nyctias (Perkins, 1905)
Tomosvaryella oligoseta De Meyer, 1993
Tomosvaryella olmii De Meyer & Foldvari, 2008
Tomosvaryella olympicola (Janssens, 1955)
Tomosvaryella ornatitarsalis Hardy, 1954
Tomosvaryella orthocladia Kuznetzov, 1994
Tomosvaryella oryzaetora Koizumi, 1959
Tomosvaryella palliditarsis (Collin, 1931)
Tomosvaryella parakuthyi De Meyer, 1995
Tomosvaryella parvicuspis Hardy, 1961
Tomosvaryella pauca Hardy, 1943
Tomosvaryella pectinalis Ale-Rocha, 1996
Tomosvaryella pennatula Kuznetzov, 1994
Tomosvaryella perissosceles Hardy, 1965
Tomosvaryella pernitida (Becker, 1924)
Tomosvaryella perpusilla (Collin, 1941)
Tomosvaryella pilosiventris Becker, 1900
Tomosvaryella pistacia Majnon-Jahromi & Kehlmaier, 2017
Tomosvaryella platensis Ale-Rocha, 1996
Tomosvaryella polita (Williston, 1896)
Tomosvaryella propinqua (Becker, 1913)
Tomosvaryella propria Hardy, 1949
Tomosvaryella prostata Hardy, 1962
Tomosvaryella pruinosa Kozanek, 1992
Tomosvaryella pseudophanes (Perkins, 1905)
Tomosvaryella pterae Kapoor & Grewal, 1985
Tomosvaryella pulchra Kozanek, 1992
Tomosvaryella pusilla De Meyer, 1995
Tomosvaryella quadradentis Hardy, 1943
Tomosvaryella ramnagariensis Kapoor, Grewal & Sharma, 1987
Tomosvaryella relicta Kuznetzov, 1994
Tomosvaryella resurgens De Meyer, 1997
Tomosvaryella robusta Hardy, 1968
Tomosvaryella rossica Kuznetzov, 1993
Tomosvaryella ruwenzoriensis De Meyer, 1993
Tomosvaryella sachtlebeni (Aczél, 1940)
Tomosvaryella santaroi Ouchi, 1943
Tomosvaryella santiagoensis De Meyer & Skevington, 2000
Tomosvaryella scalprata Yang & Xu, 1987
Tomosvaryella scopulata Hardy, 1962
Tomosvaryella sedomensis De Meyer, 1995
Tomosvaryella sentis Hardy, 1968
Tomosvaryella sepulta De Meyer, 1997
Tomosvaryella setositora Hardy, 1961
Tomosvaryella shaoshanensis Yang & Xu, 1998
Tomosvaryella sigillata Kuznetzov, 1994
Tomosvaryella similis (Hough, 1899)
Tomosvaryella singalensis (Kertész, 1903)
Tomosvaryella singula Hardy, 1950
Tomosvaryella singularis De Meyer, 1993
Tomosvaryella singuloides De Meyer, 1993
Tomosvaryella songinoensis Kuznetzov, 1994
Tomosvaryella sonorensis (Cole, 1923)
Tomosvaryella spangleri Scarbrough & Knutson, 1989
Tomosvaryella speciosa Hardy, 1949
Tomosvaryella spectata Kuznetzov, 1994
Tomosvaryella spicata Kuznetzov, 1994
Tomosvaryella spiculata Hardy, 1972
Tomosvaryella spinea Kuznetzov, 1994
Tomosvaryella spinigera De Meyer, 1993
Tomosvaryella spinosa Ale-Rocha, 1996
Tomosvaryella spinulenta Kuznetzov, 1994
Tomosvaryella spinulifera Kuznetzov, 1994
Tomosvaryella stackelbergi Kuznetzov, 1994
Tomosvaryella subafricana De Meyer, 1993
Tomosvaryella subhectena Kapoor, Grewal & Sharma, 1987
Tomosvaryella subnitens (Cresson, 1911)
Tomosvaryella subrobusta Kapoor, Grewal & Sharma, 1987
Tomosvaryella subvirescens (Loew, 1872)
Tomosvaryella sugonjaevi Kuznetzov, 1994
Tomosvaryella sumbarensis Kuznetzov, 1993
Tomosvaryella surstylae Kapoor, Grewal & Sharma, 1987
Tomosvaryella sylvatica (Meigen, 1824)
Tomosvaryella sylvaticoides (Lamb, 1922)
Tomosvaryella sylvicola Kuznetzov, 1994
Tomosvaryella synadelpha (Perkins, 1905)
Tomosvaryella synadelphoides (Meijere, 1914)
Tomosvaryella tadzhikorum Kuznetzov, 1994
Tomosvaryella talyshensis Kuznetzov, 1994
Tomosvaryella tanaitidis Kuznetzov, 1994
Tomosvaryella tanasijtshuki Kuznetzov, 1994
Tomosvaryella tattapaniensis Kapoor, Grewal & Sharma, 1987
Tomosvaryella taurica Kuznetzov, 1994
Tomosvaryella tecta De Meyer, 1993
Tomosvaryella teligera Kuznetzov, 1994
Tomosvaryella tenebricosa Kuznetzov, 1994
Tomosvaryella tenera Kuznetzov, 1994
Tomosvaryella teneroidea Kuznetzov, 1994
Tomosvaryella tenuata Kuznetzov, 1994
Tomosvaryella torosa Hardy, 1961
Tomosvaryella toxodentis (Hardy and Knowlton, 1939)
Tomosvaryella translata (Walker, 1857)
Tomosvaryella transvaalensis De Meyer, 1993
Tomosvaryella trichotibialis De Meyer, 1995
Tomosvaryella tridens Hardy, 1950
Tomosvaryella trigona Kuznetzov, 1994
Tomosvaryella trjapitzini Kuznetzov, 1994
Tomosvaryella troangulatus Kapoor, Grewal & Sharma, 1987
Tomosvaryella trochanterata Kuznetzov, 1994
Tomosvaryella trochantericola Kuznetzov, 1994
Tomosvaryella tuberculatus Hardy, 1948
Tomosvaryella tumida Hardy, 1940
Tomosvaryella turgayica Kuznetzov, 1994
Tomosvaryella turgida Hardy, 1940
Tomosvaryella ubsunurensis Kuznetzov, 1994
Tomosvaryella unguiculatus (Cresson, 1911)
Tomosvaryella urdaensis Kuznetzov, 1994
Tomosvaryella urgamalensis Kuznetzov, 1994
Tomosvaryella utahensis (Hardy and Knowlton, 1939)
Tomosvaryella vagabunda (Knab, 1915)
Tomosvaryella venezuelana Ale-Rocha, 1993
Tomosvaryella verrucula Kuznetzov, 1993
Tomosvaryella vicina (Becker, 1900)
Tomosvaryella virlai Ale-Rocha, 1996
Tomosvaryella vittigera Kuznetzov, 1994
Tomosvaryella wilburi (Hardy, 1939)
Tomosvaryella xerophila Hardy, 1943
Tomosvaryella zimini Kuznetzov, 1993

References

Tomosvaryella
Articles created by Qbugbot